This is a list of the bird species recorded in Micronesia. The avifauna of the Federated States of Micronesia include a total of 240 species, of which 22 are endemic, and 13 have been introduced. Of those species, 24 are globally threatened.

This list's taxonomic treatment (designation and sequence of orders, families and species) and nomenclature (common and scientific names) follow the conventions of The Clements Checklist of Birds of the World, 2022 edition. The family accounts at the beginning of each heading reflect this taxonomy, as do the species counts found in each family account. Introduced and accidental species are included in the total counts for Micronesia.

The following tags have been used to highlight several categories. The commonly occurring native species do not fall into any of these categories.

(A) Accidental - a species that rarely or accidentally occurs in Micronesia
(E) Endemic - a species endemic to Micronesia
(I) Introduced - a species introduced to Micronesia as a consequence, direct or indirect, of human actions
(EW) Extinct in the wild
(Ex) Extinct

Ducks, geese, and waterfowl
Order: AnseriformesFamily: Anatidae

Anatidae includes the ducks and most duck-like waterfowl, such as geese and swans. These birds are adapted to an aquatic existence with webbed feet, flattened bills, and feathers that are excellent at shedding water due to an oily coating.

Snow goose, Chen caerulescens (A)
Cackling goose, Branta hutchinsii (A)
Canada goose, Branta canadensis (A)
Garganey, Spatula querquedula (A)
Northern shoveler, Spatula clypeata
Gadwall, Mareca strepera (A)
Eurasian wigeon, Mareca penelope
American wigeon, Mareca americana (A)
Pacific black duck, Anas superciliosa
Mallard, Anas platyrhynchos (A)
Northern pintail, Anas acuta
Green-winged teal, Anas crecca
Canvasback, Aythya valisineria (A)
Redhead, Aythya americana
Common pochard, Aythya ferina (A)
Tufted duck, Aythya fuligula
Greater scaup, Aythya marila

Megapodes
Order: GalliformesFamily: Megapodiidae

The Megapodiidae are stocky, medium-large chicken-like birds with small heads and large feet. All but the malleefowl occupy jungle habitats and most have brown or black coloring.

Micronesian scrubfowl, Megapodius laperouse

Pheasants, grouse, and allies
Order: GalliformesFamily: Phasianidae

The Phasianidae are a family of terrestrial birds which consists of quails, partridges, snowcocks, francolins, spurfowls, tragopans, monals, pheasants, peafowls and jungle fowls. In general, they are plump (although they vary in size) and have broad, relatively short wings.

Blue-breasted quail, Synoicus chinensis (I)
Black francolin, Francolinus francolinus (I)
Red junglefowl, Gallus gallus (I)

Pigeons and doves
Order: ColumbiformesFamily: Columbidae

Pigeons and doves are stout-bodied birds with short necks and short slender bills with a fleshy cere.

Rock pigeon, Columba livia (I)
Philippine collared-dove, Streptopelia dusumieri (I)
Shy ground dove, Alopecoenas stairi (I)
Caroline Islands ground dove, Alopecoenas kubaryi (E)
White-throated ground dove, Alopecoenas xanthonurus
Nicobar pigeon, Caloenas nicobarica
Purple-capped fruit-dove, Ptilinopus ponapensis 
Kosrae fruit-dove, Ptilinopus hernsheimi (E)
Crimson-crowned fruit-dove, Ptilinopus porphyraceus
Mariana fruit-dove, Ptilinopus roseicapilla (E)
Micronesian imperial-pigeon, Ducula oceanica

Cuckoos
Order: CuculiformesFamily: Cuculidae

The family Cuculidae includes cuckoos, roadrunners and anis. These birds are of variable size with slender bodies, long tails and strong legs. The Old World cuckoos are brood parasites.

Chestnut-winged cuckoo, Clamator coromandus (A)
Long-tailed koel, Urodynamis taitensis
Shining bronze-cuckoo, Chrysococcyx lucidus (A)
Brush cuckoo, Cacomantis variolosus (A)
Northern hawk-cuckoo, Hierococcyx hyperythrus (A)
Hodgson's hawk-cuckoo, Hierococcyx nisicolor (A)
Common cuckoo, Cuculus canorus (A)
Oriental cuckoo, Cuculus optatus

Swifts
Order: CaprimulgiformesFamily: Apodidae

Swifts are small birds which spend the majority of their lives flying. These birds have very short legs and never settle voluntarily on the ground, perching instead only on vertical surfaces. Many swifts have long swept-back wings which resemble a crescent or boomerang.

Uniform swiftlet, Aerodramus vanikorensis
Mariana swiftlet, Aerodramus bartschi (E)
Caroline Islands swiftlet, Aerodramus inquietus (E)
Pacific swift, Apus pacificus (A)

Rails, gallinules, and coots
Order: GruiformesFamily: Rallidae

Rallidae is a large family of small to medium-sized birds which includes the rails, crakes, coots and gallinules. Typically they inhabit dense vegetation in damp environments near lakes, swamps or rivers. In general they are shy and secretive birds, making them difficult to observe. Most species have strong legs and long toes which are well adapted to soft uneven surfaces. They tend to have short, rounded wings and to be weak fliers.

Buff-banded rail, Gallirallus philippensis
Eurasian moorhen, Gallinula chloropus
Eurasian coot, Fulica atra (A)
Black-backed swamphen, Porphyrio indicus
Australasian swamphen, Porphyrio melanotus
Pale-vented bush-hen, Amaurornis moluccana (A)
White-browed crake, Poliolimnas cinereus
Red-legged crake, Rallina fasciata (A)
Slaty-legged crake, Rallina eurizonoides
Spotless crake, Zapornia tabuensis
Kosrae crake, Zapornia monasa (E) (Ex)

Stilts and avocets
Order: CharadriiformesFamily: Recurvirostridae

Recurvirostridae is a family of large wading birds, which includes the avocets and stilts. The avocets have long legs and long up-curved bills. The stilts have extremely long legs and long, thin, straight bills.

Black-winged stilt, Himantopus himantopus
Pied stilt, Himantopus leucocephalus (A)
Black-necked stilt, Himantopus mexicanus (A)

Oystercatchers
Order: CharadriiformesFamily: Haematopodidae

The oystercatchers are large and noisy plover-like birds, with strong bills used for smashing or prising open molluscs. 

Eurasian oystercatcher, Haematopus ostralegus (A)

Plovers and lapwings
Order: CharadriiformesFamily: Charadriidae

The family Charadriidae includes the plovers, dotterels and lapwings. They are small to medium-sized birds with compact bodies, short, thick necks and long, usually pointed, wings. They are found in open country worldwide, mostly in habitats near water.

Black-bellied plover, Pluvialis squatarola
Pacific golden-plover, Pluvialis fulva
Lesser sand-plover, Charadrius mongolus
Greater sand-plover, Charadrius leschenaultii
Kentish plover, Charadrius alexandrinus (A)
Common ringed plover, Charadrius hiaticula (A)
Little ringed plover, Charadrius dubius (A)
Oriental plover, Charadrius veredus (A)

Sandpipers and allies
Order: CharadriiformesFamily: Scolopacidae

Scolopacidae is a large diverse family of small to medium-sized shorebirds including the sandpipers, curlews, godwits, shanks, tattlers, woodcocks, snipes, dowitchers and phalaropes. The majority of these species eat small invertebrates picked out of the mud or soil. Variation in length of legs and bills enables multiple species to feed in the same habitat, particularly on the coast, without direct competition for food.

Bristle-thighed curlew, Numenius tahitiensis
Whimbrel, Numenius phaeopus
Little curlew, Numenius minutus (A)
Far Eastern curlew, Numenius madagascariensis
Eurasian curlew, Numenius arquata (A)
Bar-tailed godwit, Limosa lapponica
Black-tailed godwit, Limosa limosa
Ruddy turnstone, Arenaria interpres
Great knot, Calidris tenuirostris (A)
Red knot, Calidris canutus (A)
Ruff, Calidris pugnax
Broad-billed sandpiper, Calidris falcinellus (A)
Sharp-tailed sandpiper, Calidris acuminata
Curlew sandpiper, Calidris ferruginea
Temminck's stint, Calidris temminckii (A)
Long-toed stint, Calidris subminuta
Red-necked stint, Calidris ruficollis
Sanderling, Calidris alba
Dunlin, Calidris alpina (A)
Buff-breasted sandpiper, Calidris subruficollis (A)
Pectoral sandpiper, Calidris melanotos
Latham's snipe, Gallinago hardwickii (A)
Common snipe, Gallinago gallinago (A)
Swinhoe's snipe, Gallinago megala
Terek sandpiper, Xenus cinereus
Red phalarope, Phalaropus fulicarius (A)
Common sandpiper, Actitis hypoleucos
Spotted sandpiper, Actitis macularia (A)
Gray-tailed tattler, Tringa brevipes
Wandering tattler, Tringa incana
Spotted redshank, Tringa erythropus (A)
Greater yellowlegs, Tringa melanoleuca (A)
Common greenshank, Tringa nebularia
Nordmann's greenshank, Tringa guttifer (A)
Marsh sandpiper, Tringa stagnatilis
Wood sandpiper, Tringa glareola
Common redshank, Tringa totanus

Pratincoles and coursers
Order: CharadriiformesFamily: Glareolidae

Glareolidae is a family of wading birds comprising the pratincoles, which have short legs, long pointed wings and long forked tails, and the coursers, which have long legs, short wings and long pointed bills which curve downwards.

Oriental pratincole, Glareola maldivarum (A)

Skuas and jaegers
Order: CharadriiformesFamily: Stercorariidae

The family Stercorariidae are, in general, medium to large birds, typically with gray or brown plumage, often with white markings on the wings. They nest on the ground in temperate and arctic regions and are long-distance migrants.

South Polar skua, Stercorarius maccormicki (A)
Pomarine jaeger, Stercorarius pomarinus
Parasitic jaeger, Stercorarius parasiticus (A)
Long-tailed jaeger, Stercorarius longicaudus (A)

Gulls, terns, and skimmers
Order: CharadriiformesFamily: Laridae

Laridae is a family of medium to large seabirds, the gulls, terns, and skimmers. Gulls are typically gray or white, often with black markings on the head or wings. They have stout, longish bills and webbed feet. Terns are a group of generally medium to large seabirds typically with gray or white plumage, often with black markings on the head. Most terns hunt fish by diving but some pick insects off the surface of fresh water. Terns are generally long-lived birds, with several species known to live in excess of 30 years.

Black-headed gull, Chroicocephalus ridibundus
Laughing gull, Leucophaeus atricilla (A)
Franklin's gull, Leucophaeus pipixcan (A)
Herring gull, Larus argentatus (A)
Brown noddy, Anous stolidus
Black noddy, Anous minutus
Blue-gray noddy, Anous ceruleus
White tern, Gygis alba
Sooty tern, Onychoprion fuscatus
Gray-backed tern, Onychoprion lunatus
Bridled tern, Onychoprion anaethetus
Little tern, Sternula albifrons
Gull-billed tern, Gelochelidon nilotica (A)
White-winged tern, Chlidonias leucopterus
Whiskered tern, Chlidonias hybrida (A)
Black-naped tern, Sterna sumatrana
Common tern, Sterna hirundo
Arctic tern, Sterna paradisaea (A)
Great crested tern, Thalasseus bergii

Tropicbirds
Order: PhaethontiformesFamily: Phaethontidae

Tropicbirds are slender white birds of tropical oceans, with exceptionally long central tail feathers. Their heads and long wings have black markings.

White-tailed tropicbird, Phaethon lepturus
Red-tailed tropicbird, Phaethon rubricauda

Albatrosses
Order: ProcellariiformesFamily: Diomedeidae

The albatrosses are among the largest of flying birds, and the great albatrosses from the genus Diomedea have the largest wingspans of any extant birds.

Laysan albatross, Phoebastria immutabilis (A)
Black-footed albatross, Phoebastria nigripes
Short-tailed albatross, Phoebastria albatrus

Southern storm-petrels
Order: ProcellariiformesFamily: Oceanitidae

The southern storm-petrels are relatives of the petrels and are the smallest seabirds. They feed on planktonic crustaceans and small fish picked from the surface, typically while hovering. The flight is fluttering and sometimes bat-like.

Wilson's storm-petrel, Oceanites oceanicus (A)
Polynesian storm-petrel, Nesofregetta fuliginosa

Northern storm-petrels
Order: ProcellariiformesFamily: Hydrobatidae

Though the members of this family are similar in many respects to the southern storm-petrels, including their general appearance and habits, there are enough genetic differences to warrant their placement in a separate family.

Leach's storm-petrel, Hydrobates leucorhous
Band-rumped storm-petrel, Hydrobates castro (A)
Matsudaira's storm-petrel, Hydrobates matsudairae

Shearwaters and petrels
Order: ProcellariiformesFamily: Procellariidae

The procellariids are the main group of medium-sized "true petrels", characterized by united nostrils with medium septum and a long outer functional primary.

Kermadec petrel, Pterodroma neglecta (A)
Juan Fernandez petrel, Pterodroma externa
White-necked petrel, Pterodroma cervicalis (A)
Bonin petrel, Pterodroma hypoleuca
Black-winged petrel, Pterodroma nigripennis
Stejneger's petrel, Pterodroma longirostris (A)
Bulwer's petrel, Bulweria bulwerii (A)
Tahiti petrel, Pseudobulweria rostrata (A)
Streaked shearwater, Calonectris leucomelas (A)
Flesh-footed shearwater, Ardenna carneipes (A)
Wedge-tailed shearwater, Ardenna pacificus
Buller's shearwater, Ardenna bulleri (A)
Sooty shearwater, Ardenna griseus (A)
Short-tailed shearwater, Ardenna tenuirostris
Christmas shearwater, Puffinus nativitatis
Newell's shearwater, Puffinus newelli (A)
Tropical shearwater, Puffinus bailloni

Frigatebirds
Order: SuliformesFamily: Fregatidae

Frigatebirds are large seabirds usually found over tropical oceans. They are large, black and white or completely black, with long wings and deeply forked tails. The males have colored inflatable throat pouches. They do not swim or walk and cannot take off from a flat surface. Having the largest wingspan-to-body-weight ratio of any bird, they are essentially aerial, able to stay aloft for more than a week.

Lesser frigatebird, Fregata ariel (A)
Great frigatebird, Fregata minor

Boobies and gannets
Order: SuliformesFamily: Sulidae

The sulids comprise the gannets and boobies. Both groups are medium to large coastal seabirds that plunge-dive for fish.

Masked booby, Sula dactylatra
Brown booby, Sula leucogaster
Red-footed booby, Sula sula

Cormorants and shags
Order: SuliformesFamily: Phalacrocoracidae

Phalacrocoracidae is a family of medium to large coastal, fish-eating seabirds that includes cormorants and shags. Plumage coloration varies, with the majority having mainly dark plumage, some species being black-and-white and a few being colorful.

Little pied cormorant, Microcarbo melanoleucos
Great cormorant, Phalacrocorax carbo (A)

Pelicans
Order: PelecaniformesFamily: Pelecanidae

Pelicans are large water birds with a distinctive pouch under their beak. As with other members of the order Pelecaniformes, they have webbed feet with four toes.

Australian pelican, Pelecanus conspicillatus (A)

Herons, egrets, and bitterns
Order: PelecaniformesFamily: Ardeidae

The family Ardeidae contains the bitterns, herons, and egrets. Herons and egrets are medium to large wading birds with long necks and legs. Bitterns tend to be shorter necked and more wary. Members of Ardeidae fly with their necks retracted, unlike other long-necked birds such as storks, ibises and spoonbills.

Yellow bittern, Ixobrychus sinensis
Schrenck's bittern, Ixobrychus eurhythmus (A)
Cinnamon bittern, Ixobrychus cinnamomeus (A)
Black bittern, Ixobrychus flavicollis (A)
Gray heron, Ardea cinerea (A)
Great egret, Ardea alba
Intermediate egret, Ardea intermedia (A)
Little egret, Egretta garzetta
Pacific reef-heron, Egretta sacra
Cattle egret, Bubulcus ibis
Striated heron, Butorides striata (A)
Black-crowned night-heron, Nycticorax nycticorax (A)
Nankeen night-heron, Nycticorax caledonicus
Japanese night-heron, Gorsachius goisagi (A)
Malayan night-heron, Gorsachius melanolophus (A)

Osprey
Order: AccipitriformesFamily: Pandionidae

The family Pandionidae contains only one species, the osprey. The osprey is a medium-large raptor which is a specialist fish-eater with a worldwide distribution.

Osprey, Pandion haliaetus (A)

Hawks, eagles, and kites
Order: AccipitriformesFamily: Accipitridae

Accipitridae is a family of birds of prey, which includes hawks, eagles, kites, harriers and Old World vultures. These birds have powerful hooked beaks for tearing flesh from their prey, strong legs, powerful talons and keen eyesight.

Gray-faced buzzard, Butastur indicus (A)
Chinese sparrowhawk, Accipiter soloensis
Japanese sparrowhawk, Accipiter gularis
Brahminy kite, Haliastur indus (A)

Owls
Order: StrigiformesFamily: Strigidae

The typical owls are small to large solitary nocturnal birds of prey. They have large forward-facing eyes and ears, a hawk-like beak and a conspicuous circle of feathers around each eye called a facial disk.

Short-eared owl, Asio flammeus

Kingfishers
Order: CoraciiformesFamily: Alcedinidae

Kingfishers are medium-sized birds with large heads, long pointed bills, short legs and stubby tails.

Guam kingfisher, Todirhamphus cinnamominus (EW)
Pohnpei kingfisher, Todirhamphus reichenbachii (E)
Sacred kingfisher, Todirhamphus sanctus
Collared kingfisher, Todirhamphus chloris

Bee-eaters
Order: CoraciiformesFamily: Meropidae

The bee-eaters are a group of near passerine birds in the family Meropidae. Most species are found in Africa but others occur in southern Europe, Madagascar, Australia and New Guinea. They are characterized by richly colored plumage, slender bodies and usually elongated central tail feathers. All are colorful and have long downturned bills and pointed wings, which give them a swallow-like appearance when seen from afar.

Rainbow bee-eater, Merops ornatus

Rollers
Order: CoraciiformesFamily: Coraciidae

Rollers resemble crows in size and build, but are more closely related to the kingfishers and bee-eaters. They share the colorful appearance of those groups with blues and browns predominating. The two inner front toes are connected, but the outer toe is not.

Dollarbird, Eurystomus orientalis (A)

Falcons and caracaras
Order: FalconiformesFamily: Falconidae

Falconidae is a family of diurnal birds of prey. They differ from hawks, eagles and kites in that they kill with their beaks instead of their talons.

Eurasian kestrel, Falco tinnunculus (A)
Peregrine falcon, Falco peregrinus

Cockatoos
Order: PsittaciformesFamily: Cacatuidae

The cockatoos share many features with other parrots including the characteristic curved beak shape and a zygodactyl foot, with two forward toes and two backwards toes. They differ, however in a number of characteristics, including the often spectacular movable headcrest.

Sulphur-crested cockatoo, Cacatua galerita (I)

Old World parrots
Order: PsittaciformesFamily: Psittaculidae

Parrots are small to large birds with a characteristic curved beak. Their upper mandibles have slight mobility in the joint with the skull and they have a generally erect stance. All parrots are zygodactyl, having the four toes on each foot placed two at the front and two to the back.

Eclectus parrot, Eclectus roratus (I)
Pohnpei lorikeet, Trichoglossus rubiginosus (E)

Honeyeaters
Order: PasseriformesFamily: Meliphagidae

The honeyeaters are a large and diverse family of small to medium-sized birds most common in Australia and New Guinea. They are nectar feeders and closely resemble other nectar-feeding passerines.

Micronesian myzomela, Myzomela rubratra

Cuckooshrikes
Order: PasseriformesFamily: Campephagidae

The cuckooshrikes are small to medium-sized passerine birds. They are predominantly grayish with white and black, although some species are brightly colored.

Common cicadabird, Edolisoma tenuirostre

Woodswallows, bellmagpies, and allies
Order: PasseriformesFamily: Artamidae

The woodswallows are soft-plumaged, somber-colored passerine birds. They are smooth, agile flyers with moderately large, semi-triangular wings.

White-breasted woodswallow, Artamus leucorynchus (A)

Fantails
Order: PasseriformesFamily: Rhipiduridae

The fantails are small insectivorous birds which are specialist aerial feeders.

Rufous fantail, Rhipidura rufifrons
Pohnpei fantail, Rhipidura kubaryi (E)

Drongos
Order: PasseriformesFamily: Dicruridae

The drongos are mostly black or dark gray in color, sometimes with metallic tints. They have long forked tails, and some Asian species have elaborate tail decorations. They have short legs and sit very upright when perched, like a shrike. They flycatch or take prey from the ground.

Black drongo, Dicrurus macrocercus (I)

Monarch flycatchers
Order: PasseriformesFamily: Monarchidae

The monarch flycatchers are small to medium-sized insectivorous passerines which hunt by flycatching.

Truk monarch, Metabolus rugensis (E)
Yap monarch, Monarcha godeffroyi (E)
Pohnpei flycatcher, Myiagra pluto (E)
Oceanic flycatcher, Myiagra oceanica (E)

Shrikes
Order: PasseriformesFamily: Laniidae

Shrikes are passerine birds known for their habit of catching other birds and small animals and impaling the uneaten portions of their bodies on thorns. A typical shrike's beak is hooked, like a bird of prey.

Brown shrike, Lanius cristatus (A)

Reed warblers and allies
Order: PasseriformesFamily: Acrocephalidae

The family Acrocephalidae is a group of small insectivorous passerine birds. Most are of generally undistinguished appearance, but many have distinctive songs.

Caroline reed warbler, Acrocephalus syrinx (E)
Mangareva reed warbler, Acrocephalus astrolabii (E) (Ex)

Grassbirds and allies
Order: PasseriformesFamily: Locustellidae

Locustellidae are a family of small insectivorous songbirds found mainly in Eurasia, Africa, and the Australian region. They are smallish birds with tails that are usually long and pointed, and tend to be drab brownish or buffy all over.

Lanceolated warbler, Locustella lanceolata (A)

Swallows
Order: PasseriformesFamily: Hirundinidae

The family Hirundinidae is adapted to aerial feeding. They have a slender streamlined body, long pointed wings and a short bill with a wide gape. The feet are adapted to perching rather than walking, and the front toes are partially joined at the base.

Barn swallow, Hirundo rustica
Tree martin, Petrochelidon nigricans (A)
Asian house-martin, Delichon dasypus

White-eyes, yuhinas, and allies
Order: PasseriformesFamily: Zosteropidae

The white-eyes are small and mostly undistinguished, their plumage above being generally some dull color like greenish-olive, but some species have a white or bright yellow throat, breast or lower parts, and several have buff flanks. As their name suggests, many species have a white ring around each eye.

Truk white-eye, Rukia ruki (E)
Long-billed white-eye, Rukia longirostra (E)
Caroline Islands white-eye, Zosterops semperi
Plain white-eye, Zosterops hypolais (E)
Pohnpei white-eye, Zosterops ponapensis (E)
Kosrae white-eye, Zosterops cinereus (E)
Yap white-eye, Zosterops oleagineus (E)

Starlings
Order: PasseriformesFamily: Sturnidae

Starlings are small to medium-sized passerine birds. Their flight is strong and direct and they are very gregarious. Their preferred habitat is fairly open country. They eat insects and fruit. Plumage is typically dark with a metallic sheen.

Pohnpei starling, Aplonis pelzelni (E)
Micronesian starling, Aplonis opaca
Kosrae starling, Aplonis corvina (E) (Ex)
Chestnut-cheeked starling, Agropsar philippensis (A)
White-cheeked starling, Spodiopsar cineraceus (A)

Thrushes and allies
Order: PasseriformesFamily: Turdidae

The thrushes are a group of passerine birds that occur mainly in the Old World. They are plump, soft plumaged, small to medium-sized insectivores or sometimes omnivores, often feeding on the ground. Many have attractive songs.

Eyebrowed thrush, Turdus obscurus (A)
Dusky thrush, Turdus naumanni (A)

Old World flycatchers
Order: PasseriformesFamily: Muscicapidae

Old World flycatchers are a large group of small passerine birds native to the Old World. They are mainly small arboreal insectivores. The appearance of these birds is highly varied, but they mostly have weak songs and harsh calls.

Gray-streaked flycatcher, Muscicapa griseisticta (A)
Siberian rubythroat, Calliope calliope (A)
Narcissus flycatcher, Ficedula narcissina (A)
Blue rock-thrush, Monticola solitarius (A)

Waxbills and allies
Order: PasseriformesFamily: Estrildidae

The estrildid finches are small passerine birds of the Old World tropics and Australasia. They are gregarious and often colonial seed eaters with short thick but pointed bills. They are all similar in structure and habits, but have wide variation in plumage colors and patterns.

Blue-faced parrotfinch, Erythrura trichroa
Scaly-breasted munia, Lonchura punctulata (I)
Chestnut munia, Lonchura atricapilla (I)
Mottled munia, Lonchura hunsteini (I)

Old World sparrows
Order: PasseriformesFamily: Passeridae

Old World sparrows are small passerine birds. In general, sparrows tend to be small, plump, brown or gray birds with short tails and short powerful beaks. Sparrows are seed eaters, but they also consume small insects.

Eurasian tree sparrow, Passer montanus (I)

Wagtails and pipits
Order: PasseriformesFamily: Motacillidae

Motacillidae is a family of small passerine birds with medium to long tails. They include the wagtails, longclaws and pipits. They are slender, ground feeding insectivores of open country.

Gray wagtail, Motacilla cinerea
Western yellow wagtail, Motacilla flava 
Eastern yellow wagtail, Motacilla tschutschensis (A)
Red-throated pipit, Anthus cervinus (A)

Old World buntings
Order: PasseriformesFamily: Emberizidae

The emberizids are a large family of passerine birds. They are seed-eating birds with distinctively shaped bills. Many emberizid species have distinctive head patterns.

Black-headed bunting, Emberiza melanocephala (A)

See also
List of birds
Lists of birds by region

References

Micronesia
'
birds
birds